Alisporivir (INN), or Debio 025, DEB025, (or UNIL-025) is a cyclophilin inhibitor. Its structure is reminiscent of, and synthesized from ciclosporin.

It inhibits cyclophilin A. Alisporivir is not immunosuppressive.

It is being researched for potential use in the treatment of hepatitis C. It has also been investigated for Duchenne muscular dystrophy and may have therapeutic potential in Alzheimer's disease.

Alisporivir is under development by Debiopharm for Japan and by Novartis for the rest of the world (licence granted by Debiopharm) since February 2010.

References

Antiviral drugs
Peptides
Orphan drugs